Out Front is a 1961 album by American jazz trumpeter Booker Little featuring performances recorded and released by the Candid label.

Reception

The AllMusic review by Scott Yanow stated "His seven now-obscure originals (several of which deserve to be revived) are challenging for the soloists and there are many strong moments during these consistently challenging and satisfying performances".

Track listing
All compositions by Booker Little
 "We Speak" – 6:47 
 "Strength and Sanity" – 6:18 
 "Quiet Please" – 8:11 
 "Moods in Free Time" – 5:45 
 "Man of Words" – 4:52 
 "Hazy Hues" – 6:42 
 "A New Day" – 5:31 
*Recorded at Nola's Penthouse Sound Studios in New York City on March 17, 1961 (tracks 1, 3 and 7) and April 4, 1961 (tracks 2 & 4–6).

Personnel
Booker Little – trumpet
Julian Priester – trombone
Eric Dolphy – alto saxophone, bass clarinet, flute
Don Friedman – piano
Art Davis (tracks 1, 3 & 7), Ron Carter (tracks 2 and 4–6) – bass
Max Roach – drums, timpani, vibraphone

References

Candid Records albums
Booker Little albums
1961 albums
Albums produced by Nat Hentoff